Bernd Jäger (born 18 November 1951 in Kahla) is a former East German gymnast who competed in the 1976 Summer Olympics.

In the 1974 world championships in Varna, competing on horizontal bar, he first performed his forward somersault starting from forward giant and ending in backward swing, named later Jägersalto. With this element, Jäger started the worldwide development of release elements on high bar, followed by innovations by Eberhard Gienger, Stoyan Delchev and others.

References

1951 births
People from Kahla
Living people
German male artistic gymnasts
Olympic gymnasts of East Germany
Gymnasts at the 1976 Summer Olympics
Olympic bronze medalists for East Germany
Olympic medalists in gymnastics
Sportspeople from Thuringia
Medalists at the 1976 Summer Olympics
Medalists at the World Artistic Gymnastics Championships
Originators of elements in artistic gymnastics